Abigail de Andrade (1864–1890) was a Brazilian painter. Abigail de Andrade's name, practically absent from art history books, is mentioned by the painter and art historian Theodoro Braga (1872-1953), who lists the few studies published about Abigail de Andrade in the book Artists Painters from Brazil, 1942.

Early life and education 

Andrade was born in Vassouras, in the province of Rio de Janeiro. She studied at the Liceu de Artes e Ofícios in 1882, one year after the institution first admitted women. Her teachers included Angelo Agostini and Joaquim José Insley Pacheco. Andrade painted genre scenes, still lifes and portraits.

Career 
Andrade participated in the Imperial Academy of Fine Arts' Salon in 1884, winning the gold medal. Two of her paintings, O cesto de compras (Shopping basket) and Um canto do meu ateliê (A corner of my studio), were praised by the art critics. 

Andrade had two solo exhibitions in 1886 in Rio de Janeiro, at Casa Vicitas and Casa Costrejean.

Personal life 
Andrade's relationship with her teacher Angelo Agostini, who was married, caused a scandal in Rio de Janeiro society. The couple left Brazil in 1888 for Paris, with their daughter Angelina Agostini (1888-1973), who also became a painter. Andrade had a second son with Agostini, Angelo, who died of tuberculosis after birth. She died a year later of the same illness.

Gallery

References

External links

1864 births
1890 deaths
19th-century Brazilian painters
19th-century Brazilian women artists
Brazilian women painters
People from Vassouras